Léon Yombe (born 7 April 1944) is a Congolese sprinter. He competed in the men's 100 metres at the 1964 Summer Olympics. With Henri Elende, Yombe made up the first team from the Republic of the Congo to participate in the Olympic Games.

References

External links

1944 births
Living people
Athletes (track and field) at the 1964 Summer Olympics
Republic of the Congo male sprinters
Olympic athletes of the Republic of the Congo
Place of birth missing (living people)